Lexington Presbyterian Church is a historic Presbyterian church building at Main and Nelson Streets in Lexington, Virginia.  It was designed by architect Thomas U. Walter in 1843, and completed in 1845. A rear addition was built in 1859; stucco added in the 1880s; the building was renovated and enlarged in 1899; and the Sunday School wing was added in 1906. It is a monumental "T"-shaped, temple form stuccoed brick building in the Greek Revival style.  The front facade features a Greek Doric pedimented peristyle portico consisting of six wooden columns and a full entablature.  The building is topped by a tower with louvered belfry and spire.

Starting in 1851, Stonewall Jackson was a member of the church and taught Sunday school.  In 1863 he was buried in the church's cemetery which is now named for him.

It was listed on the National Register of Historic Places in 1979. It is in the Lexington Historic District.

References

External links
Lexington Presbyterian Church website

19th-century Presbyterian church buildings in the United States
Churches on the National Register of Historic Places in Virginia
Presbyterian churches in Virginia
Greek Revival church buildings in Virginia
Churches completed in 1843
Churches in Lexington, Virginia
National Register of Historic Places in Lexington, Virginia
Individually listed contributing properties to historic districts on the National Register in Virginia
1843 establishments in Virginia
Thomas U. Walter church buildings